Hvítá (Icelandic , "white river") is a river in Iceland that begins at Hvítárvatn glacier lake on Langjökull glacier in the highlands of Iceland at . The river flows for  before dropping down into a narrow gorge at Gullfoss waterfall.

Thereafter, the river flows between Biskupstungur  and Hrunamannahreppur districts. Here, Hvítá combines with three other rivers: Tungufljót , Brúará, and Stóra-Laxá , doubling the volume of the river. It proceeds to run through the flatlands near Grímsnes  and behind Ingólfsfjall mountain. Just north of Selfoss town, it meets Sog River where it becomes Ölfusá as it flows into the Atlantic Ocean.

Because of danger of flooding, especially during winter, Hvítá has a reputation of being the most dangerous river in Iceland.

Organised rafting excursions take place on parts of the river. The river is bridged at 4 locations, thrice at the lowland and once near the source in the highland where it is only open over the summer.

See also
List of rivers of Iceland

Rivers of Iceland